Tourism in the Democratic Republic of the Congo is uncommon. Tourists can see wildlife, indigenous cultures, and geological phenomena not found easily or anywhere else in Africa.

In the capital city, Kinshasa, limited tourism opportunities exist. In downtown Kinshasa an ivory market exists where other than the obvious, Congolese art, tribal masks, and other beautiful goods can be procured. Outside Kinshasa is a bonobo preserve called Lola Ya Bonobo. In Kinshasa visits to the Congo River or the city golf course or downtown restaurants can be nice.

Tourists can trek to see the mountain and lowland gorillas in wild, meet pygmies still practising their traditional way of life in the forests, spot bonobos and okapi—two rare species not found anywhere else on earth, and climb to the summits of active volcanoes and see a boiling lava lake in the crater of Mount Nyiragongo. The DRC has experienced frequent unrest in the eastern part of the country.

Private trips are cheaper in the DRC than in neighbouring Rwanda or Uganda.

Virunga National Park 
Virunga National Park is the first national mark in Africa, established in 1925. The park is main driver for tourism in the DRC. It is an UNESCO World Heritage site located in the east of the DRC.

On May 11, 2018, two British tourists, a park ranger, and a Congolese driver were kidnapped in Virunga National Park. The ranger was killed but the other three were released. Virunga National Park closed temporarily to address safety concerns. The park reopened in February 2019. Tourists can visit Virunga to obtain a gorilla trekking permit or to hike to the largest lava lake in the world, Mount Nyiragongo.

See also 
Virunga National Park
Economy of the Democratic Republic of the Congo

External links
 Virunga National Park Tourism Website

References

 
Congo, Democratic Republic of the